Nahr-e Karim (also Romanized as Nahr-e Karīm; also known as Karīm) is a village in Nasar Rural District, Arvandkenar District, Abadan County, Khuzestan Province, Iran. At the 2006 census, its population was 34, in 8 families.

References 

Populated places in Abadan County